Dehleez is a 1983 Pakistani Urdu-language drama film based on Emily Brontë's 1847 novel Wuthering Heights, with screenplay by Syed Noor. It started Nadeem and Shabnam with Afzaal Ahmad and Agha Talish. The music of the film was composed by Kamal Ahmed.

The film celebrated its Diamond Jubilee on the box office and won seven Nigar Awards, including best film, best director and best actor. Dehleez inspired the 1985 Hindi film Oonche Log. It was screened at the Lok Virsa Museum in 2018.

Cast 

 Nadeem
 Shabnam
 Shahid
 Afzaal Ahmad
 Agha Talish
 Aslam Pervaiz
 Shahida Mini

Soundtrack 

The music of the film was composed by Kamal Ahmed on the ltrics of Taslim Fazli.

Release 

Theatrically released on 22 April 1983, the film attained Diamond Jubilee status in the cinemas of Karachi.

Production 

In an interview with Herald, TV actress Khalida Riyasat revealed that she was offered a role in Dehleez, but she declined it due to being a supporting role.

Impact 

The film inspired the 1985 Hindi film Oonche Log, starring Rajesh Khanna and Salma Agha.

Awards 
Dehleez won seven Nigar Awards in the following categories:

References 

Films based on Wuthering Heights
1980s Urdu-language films
Urdu-language Pakistani films